"Too Good at Goodbyes" is a song by English singer Sam Smith. It was written by James Napier, Tor Hermansen, Mikkel Eriksen and Smith, and produced by Napes, Steve Fitzmaurice and StarGate. It was released on 8 September 2017 through Capitol Records, as the lead single from their second studio album, The Thrill of It All (2017).

The song reached number one in the UK and number four on the Billboard Hot 100. It also topped the charts in Australia, South Africa and New Zealand, and reached the top 10 in Belgium, Canada, Denmark, France, Ireland, Italy, Netherlands, Norway, Portugal, Sweden, and Switzerland, as well as the top 20 in Austria, Finland, Germany, and Spain.

Background and release
On 31 August 2017, Smith announced new music was coming via social media. On 1 September, Spotify put up billboards in New York City, Los Angeles, and London to announce the release date of Smith's new music. 
The song was released worldwide to download and streaming websites on 8 September.

Composition
"Too Good at Goodbyes" is in the key of D minor in common time with a tempo of 92 beats per minute. The chord progression is Dm–F–C–Gm. Smith's vocals span from F3 to D5.

Critical reception
Jon Blistein from Rolling Stone called Smith's comeback song "poignant" and wrote, "The piano-led song finds the singer pulling away from a volatile relationship. 'But every time you hurt me, the less that I cry / And every time you leave me, the quicker these tears dry,' he sings, soulfully. 'And every time you walk out, the less I love you / Baby, we don't stand a chance / It's sad, but it's true.' The lilting chorus is buoyed by a choir, as they harmonize, 'I'm way too good at goodbyes.'" Chris Willman of Variety said about the track, "Once again, Smith is plumbing the depths of melancholia with a flawless, effortlessly flexible tenor that seems to be on loan to the underworld from somewhere in the heavens. There's not a lot in the track that he, carry-over collaborator Jimmy Napes, and songwriter-producer duo Stargate have come up with to detract from that instrument. For the first minute of the song, Smith’s voice is joined only by the sparsest and most basic piano chords, along with some finger-snapping. Eventually a light beat kicks in, then a gospel choir, as if to almost mock Smith’s romantic lamentation by raising it to the level of spiritual battle." Marc Hogan of Pitchfork was more negative, and opined "'Too Good at Goodbyes' doesn't so much reflect a person exceptionally skilled in ending relationships as it feels equal parts calculating and convoluted."

Music video
Smith uploaded the official audio to their YouTube and Vevo accounts on 8 September 2017. The audio was later removed when they released the official music video for the song on 18 September 2017. It was filmed in Newcastle upon Tyne. On 29 September 2017, Smith released a video of them performing "Too Good at Goodbyes" at the Round Chapel in Hackney. , the music video has been viewed over 1.2 billion times.

Chart performance
"Too Good at Goodbyes" topped the UK Singles Chart on 15 September 2017 - for the week ending dated 21 September 2017 - with 33,000 downloads and 4.4 million streams, dethroning Taylor Swift's "Look What You Made Me Do" from the summit and giving Smith his sixth number-one single on the chart. It also stayed atop the UK charts for three consecutive weeks giving Smith his longest run at number one there. It also debuted at number one in Australia and New Zealand. It is Smith's first number one single in Australia.

In the United States, the song entered at number five on the Billboard Hot 100 on the issue dated 30 September with 90,000 downloads and 20.8 million streams, topping the Digital Songs chart and receiving an audience of 35 million in radio airplay. It is also Smith's highest debut in the country and his second song to top the Digital Songs chart after "Stay with Me" in 2014. "Too Good at Goodbyes" later ascended to number four on the issue dated 25 November, after the release of The Thrill of It All. In November 2017, the song was certified platinum in the US for shipments of one million units.

Live performances
Smith announced four live dates in September to help promote the song. They also performed it at the We Can Survive concert on 21 October.

Formats and track listings
Digital download
"Too Good at Goodbyes" – 3:21

Digital download (Acoustic)
"Too Good at Goodbyes"  – 3:40

Digital download (Galantis Remix)
"Too Good at Goodbyes"  – 3:12

Digital download (Snakehips Remix)
"Too Good at Goodbyes"  – 3:58

Credits and personnel
Personnel

 Lead vocals, Additional Background vocals – Sam Smith
 Choir arrangement – Lawrence Johnson
 Choir vocals – The LJ Singers
 Songwriting – Sam Smith, James Napier, Mikkel Storleer Eriksen, Tor Erik Hermansen
 Production – Jimmy Napes, Steve Fitzmaurice, Stargate
 Recording engineers – Steve Fitzmaurice, Darren Heelis, Gus Pirelli
 Assistant engineers – Tom Archer, Henri Davies, Isabel Gracefield Grundy, Steph Marziano, John Prestage, Will Purton
 Mixing – Steve Fitzmaurice
 Mastering – Bob Ludwig
 Drums – Earl Harvin
 Percussion – StarGate, Jimmy Napes, Earl Harvin
 Drum programming – Steve Fitzmaurice, Darren Heelis
 Bass – Jodi Milliner
 Acoustic and Rhodes electric pianos – Reuben James
 Guitar – Ben Jones
 String leaders – Richard George, Everton Nelson, Bruce White, Ian Burdge

Charts

Weekly charts

Year-end charts

Certifications

Release history

See also
 List of number-one singles of 2017 (Australia)
 List of number-one songs of 2017 (Malaysia)
 List of number-one singles from the 2010s (New Zealand)
 List of Scottish number-one singles of 2017
 List of UK Singles Chart number ones of the 2010s

References

External links

2017 songs
2017 singles
2010s ballads
Sam Smith (singer) songs
Capitol Records singles
Number-one singles in Australia
Number-one singles in Malaysia
Number-one singles in Scotland
Pop ballads
Torch songs
Songs written by Sam Smith (singer)
Songs written by Mikkel Storleer Eriksen
Songs written by Tor Erik Hermansen
Songs written by Jimmy Napes
UK Singles Chart number-one singles